Peterman may refer to:

People
J. Peterman (disambiguation)
Jocelyn Peterman, Canadian curler
John Peterman, American businessman
Harold Peterman, American politician
Melissa Peterman, American actress
Mykyta Peterman, Ukrainian football player
Nathan Peterman, American football player

Places
Peterman, Alabama (disambiguation), several places
Peterman, Houston County, Alabama
Peterman, Monroe County, Alabama

Other uses
A slang term for a Safecracker

See also
Petermann (disambiguation)